Klaus Uwe Müller (14 September 1915 — August 1989) was German chess player.

Biography
In the early 1950s Klaus Uwe Müller was one of the leading East Germany chess players. He played in first East Germany Chess Championships in 1950, 1951, 1953. 

Klaus Uwe Müller played for East Germany in the Chess Olympiad:
 In 1952, at fourth board in the 10th Chess Olympiad in Helsinki (+7, =4, -4).

Klaus Uwe Müller moved to West Germany in the mid-1950s. In 1955, he won West Berlin City Chess Championship. In later years Klaus Uwe Müller rarely participated in chess tournaments.

References

External links

Klaus Uwe Müller chess games at 365chess.com

1915 births
1989 deaths
German chess players
East German chess players
Chess Olympiad competitors
20th-century chess players